Procés Constituent is a Catalan social movement, launched on 10 April 2013. It is anti-capitalist and pro-Catalan independence, calling for 'A Republic of the 99%'.

Origins 
The initial founders of Procés Constituent were economist and activist, Arcadi Oliveres, and medical doctor and nun, Teresa Forcades, who launched the initiative by publishing a Manifesto: call for a constituent process in Catalonia. More than 10,000 signed the manifesto in the first week.

Electoral participation 

Procés Constituent stood with Barcelona en Comú in the May 2015 municipal elections in Barcelona. Procés Constituent members Gerardo Pisarello and Jaume Asens were both elected to the city council to form part of the new government.

After negotiations, Procés Constituent decided not to stand with Catalunya Sí que es Pot or the Popular Unity Candidacy (CUP) in the 2015 Catalan parliamentary elections.

References

External links 
 

Catalan independence movement
Left-wing activism
Anti-capitalist organizations
2013 establishments in Spain